Highway 12, opened in 1953, is a connection from the Trans-Canada Highway at Lytton to the town of Lillooet, one of two road connections between the Thompson-Nicola and Squamish-Lillooet Regional Districts.  The highway originally went all the way to a junction with Highway 97 at Lower Hat Creek, but when the Duffey Lake Road was paved in 1992, the section of Highway 12 from Lillooet to Highway 97 was renumbered 99.  Highway 12 follows the east bank of the Fraser River on the western flank of the small Clear Range for 62 km (39 mi) from a junction with Highway 1 at Lytton to a junction with Highway 99 just across the river from the town of Lillooet.

References

012